The 1983–84 Dayton Flyers men's basketball team represented the University of Dayton during the 1983–84 NCAA Division I men's basketball season. The Flyers, led by head coach Don Donoher, played their home games at the University of Dayton Arena and were an NCAA independent. Dayton received a bid to the NCAA tournament as No. 10 seed in the West region where they made an unexpected run to the Elite Eight. They defeated No. 7 seed  74–66 in the opening round, upset No. 2 seed Oklahoma 89–85 in the second round, and advanced over No. 6 Washington to reach the West regional final. They lost to eventual National champion Georgetown, 61–49, and finished the season 21–11.

Roster

Schedule and results

|-
!colspan=9 style=| Regular season

|-
!colspan=9 style=| NCAA Tournament

References

Dayton Flyers men's basketball seasons
Dayton
Dayton
Dayton
Dayton